Giant squid usually refers to large squid of the family Architeuthidae.

Giant squid may also refer to:

Animals
Colossal squid (Mesonychoteuthis hamiltoni), a squid in the family Cranchiidae
Giant warty squid (Kondakovia longimana), a squid in the family Onychoteuthidae

Other
Giant Squid, a post-metal, progressive rock band
Giant Squid, a video game development company, developers of Abzû

See also
 Kraken, Norse sea monster
 Cthulhu, Lovecraftian horror monster
 Giant octopus (disambiguation)
 Squid (disambiguation)

Animal common name disambiguation pages